Farmall is a rural settlement in Gauteng, South Africa. It is located in Region 1 of the City of Johannesburg. Farmall is mainly an agricultural suburb of Randburg made up of small holdings.

Farmall is also known as Chartwell West.

References

Johannesburg Region A